Bluie West One, later known as Narsarsuaq Air Base and Narsarsuaq Airport,  was built on a glacial moraine at what is now the village of Narsarsuaq, near the southern tip of Greenland. Construction by the United States Army began in June 1941. The first aircraft landed there in January 1942, as a link in the North Atlantic air ferry route in World War II. The base had a peak population of about 4,000 American servicemen, and it is estimated that some 10,000 aircraft landed there en route to the war in Europe and North Africa.

Soon after the United States entered the war, the War Department decided to deploy Major General Carl Spaatz's Eighth Air Force to Britain, putting the North Atlantic ferry route facilities constructed by the Corps to an early test. Radioing from Bluie West 1, while crossing the Atlantic in mid-June 1942, Spaatz ordered the movement to begin. The P-38 and P-39 fighters, piloted by combat crews who had been given special training in long-distance flying, were escorted by the longer-range B-17 bombers.

Other important bases in Greenland were Bluie West Eight near the present-day town of Kangerlussuaq, and Bluie East One on the almost-uninhabited east coast.

Bad weather is frequent in Southern Greenland, and Narsarsuaq is virtually surrounded by high mountains, making the approach to the steel-mat runway exceedingly difficult. The usual approach was a low-level flight up a fjord. Because the runway slopes up west to east, landings were (and still are predominantly) made to the east, with take-offs to the west, regardless of the wind direction.

BW-1's importance declined post World War II, but the U.S. Air Force maintained it as Narsarsuaq Air Base during the early Cold War years, when it served as a refuelling station for jet fighters and for helicopters crossing the North Atlantic. The runway by this time had been paved with concrete. Jets require a longer take-off run than do propeller-driven aircraft, and the air base used a small tugboat to move icebergs out of the way of planes taking off over the basin west of the runway. There is a detailed account of a visit to BW-1 in the early days of World War II by Ernest K. Gann, in the book Fate Is The Hunter.

The advent of aerial refueling, and the opening of the larger Thule Air Base in northern Greenland, made the base redundant, and it was turned over to the Danish government of Greenland in 1958. It is currently known as Narsarsuaq Airport and served by regular flights from Reykjavík, Iceland during the summer season, as well as by commuter aircraft from Kangerlussaq and other Greenlandic airfields. There is no control tower, and ceiling is required, on all approach procedures.

See also 

 Erik the Red
 Narsarsuaq Airport

References

External links
 Remembering Bluie West One
 Narsarssuak Air Base BW-1 - John Stott

Airports in Greenland
Airfields of the United States Army Air Forces Air Transport Command on the North Atlantic Route
Airfields of the United States Army Air Forces in Greenland
Airports established in 1942
1942 establishments in Greenland
Closed installations of the United States Navy